Legislative elections in France were held on 12 and 19 June 2022 to elect the 577 members of the 16th National Assembly of the Fifth French Republic. The elections took place following the 2022 French presidential election, which was held in April 2022. They have been described as the most indecisive legislative elections since the establishment of the five-year presidential term in 2000 and subsequent change of the electoral calendar in 2002.

For the first time since 1997, the incumbent president of France does not have an absolute majority in Parliament. As no alliance won a majority, it resulted in a hung parliament for the first time since 1988.

The legislative elections were contested between four principal blocs: the centrist presidential majority Ensemble coalition, including Emmanuel Macron's Renaissance, the Democratic Movement, Horizons, as well as their allies; the left-wing New Ecological and Social People's Union (NUPES), encompassing La France Insoumise, the Socialist Party, Ecologist Pole and the French Communist Party; the centre-right Union of the Right and Centre (UDC), including The Republicans, the Union of Democrats and Independents, as well as their allies; and the far-right National Rally (RN). The NUPES alliance was formed in the two months following the presidential election, in which the left-wing vote had been fragmented; it consisted of the first French Left alliance since the Plural Left in 1997.

In the first round, there was some controversy among the Ministry of the Interior and news media about which bloc finished first, as both the NUPES and Ensemble obtained about 26% of the vote. They were followed by the RN on about 19% and UDC with about 11%. Turnout for the first round was a record-low 47.5%. In the second round, when turnout was higher than that of 2017, Macron's Ensemble coalition secured the most seats (245) but fell 44 seats short of an absolute majority. The NUPES was projected to win 131 (Ministry of the Interior) or 142 seats (Le Monde), while RN became the largest parliamentary opposition as a party (89). The UDC received enough seats (64 or 71) to be a kingmaker in the next government but suffered losses.

The results were perceived by political commentators as a severe blow for Macron. They created potential for political instability and gridlock. Prime Minister Élisabeth Borne offered her resignation on 21 June 2022, but Macron refused to accept it. Talks among the various parties to form a stable majority government began later on 21 June but rapidly failed. On 6 July, Prime Minister Borne presented her minority government policy plan to the Parliament.

Background 
Following the 2017 French legislative election, the incumbent president Emmanuel Macron's party, La République En Marche! (LREM), and its allies held a majority in the National Assembly (577 seats). The LREM group had 308 deputies, the Democratic Movement and affiliated democrats group had 42 deputies, and Agir ensemble, which was created in November 2017, had 9 deputies. Although a proposal to have part of the French Parliament elected with a proportional representation system was included in Macron's platform in 2017, this election promise was not fulfilled. A similar promise was made by François Hollande during the 2012 presidential election.

Macron, from the centrist LREM, had defeated Marine Le Pen, leader of the far-right National Rally, 66–34% in the 2017 French presidential election. The 2022 French presidential election was held on 10 and 24 April. As no candidate won a majority in the first round, a runoff was held, in which Macron defeated Le Pen 58–41% and was reelected as President of France. In the first round, Macron took the lead with 27.9% of votes, while Valérie Pécresse, the candidate for the Republicans, took under 5% of the vote in the first round, the worst result in the history of the party or its Gaullist predecessors. Anne Hidalgo, the mayor of Paris, received 1.75% of the vote, the worst in the history of the Socialist Party (PS). With more than 30% of the vote, it was the best result for French far-right figures since the founding of the Fifth French Republic with the 1958 French presidential election. Jean-Luc Mélenchon of La France Insoumise (LFI) came third in the first round with 21.95% of the vote and 1.2% behind second-placed Le Pen, also coming first in the 18–24 and 25–34 age groups, as well in Île-de-France, the most populous region of France.

In the context of the legislative election common participation, as the largest French Left force in the presidential election, LFI sought to unite the main left-leaning parties around the banner of the New Ecological and Social People's Union, or NUPES. Discussions were held with Europe Ecology – The Greens, including the Ecologist Pole, as well as the French Communist Party, which joined the coalition on 2–3 May 2022, respectively; the PS reached an agreement to join the coalition on 4 May, which was confirmed by a National Council party vote on 5 May. This resulted in the first wide left-wing alliance since the Plural Left in the 1997 French legislative election.

Discussion with the Federation of the Republican Left (FGR), which wanted to join NUPES, went unanswered; the FGR then formed alliances with the Radical Party of the Left, which internally rejected integration into NUPES, and the dissident minority in the PS, among the miscellaneous left. Their candidates presented themselves as part of the "secular and republican" left between Macron and Mélenchon. The New Anticapitalist Party announced it would not enter the coalition due to what they called insurmountable ideological differences with the PS, while Lutte Ouvrière announced that the party would run its own slate separate from NUPES, which they believe to be reformist.

On 5 May 2022, LREM changed its name to Renaissance, introducing its big tent coalition for the legislative election made up of the presidential majority parties called Ensemble Citoyens (Ensemble). On 16 May, Macron appointed Élisabeth Borne as Prime Minister, replacing Jean Castex. Borne, a member of Renaissance and formerly of the PS, was serving as Macron's Minister of Labour, Employment and Economic Inclusion prior to her appointment as prime minister. She is only the second woman to hold the office.

Electoral system 
The 577 members of the National Assembly, known as deputies, are elected for five years by a two-round system in single-member constituencies. A candidate who receives an absolute majority of valid votes and a vote total greater than 25% of the registered electorate is elected in the first round. If no candidate reaches this threshold, a runoff election is held between the top two candidates plus any other candidate who received a vote total greater than 12.5% of registered voters. The candidate who receives the most votes in the second round is elected.

Dates 
According to the provisions of the Electoral Code, the election must be held within the sixty days which precede the expiry of the powers of the outgoing National Assembly, attached to the third Tuesday of June, five years after its election, except in the event of dissolution of the National Assembly. The end of the mandate of the Assembly elected in 2017 is set for 21 June 2022. The dates for the legislative elections in mainland France were set for 12 and 19 June. Declarations of candidacy must be submitted no later than 20 May for the first round and 14 June for the second round. French nationals who live abroad were able to vote in the days preceding the ballot.

Major parties and alliances contesting 
Below are the major parties and alliances contesting the elections, listed by their combined results in the previous elections. According to Le Journal du dimanche, the elections are mainly contested between three blocs: a left-wing bloc (NUPES), a presidential bloc on the center-right (Ensemble), and a far-right bloc.

Deputies not standing for reelection

Opinion polls

Results

First round 
After the first round, the New Ecological and Social People's Union (NUPES) and Ensemble Citoyens (Ensemble) obtained about 26%. Amid significant losses on the right-wing of the political spectrum for the Republicans (LR) and the Union of the Right and Centre (UDC), results for Emmanuel Macron's Ensemble alliance showed it was now the centre-right, having performed strongly among the traditionally centre-right electorate of UDC. The French far-right achieved mixed results; while the National Rally (RN) achieved 18% and was likely to obtain the necessary seats to form a parliamentary group, Éric Zemmour's Reconquête reached 4%, and both he and the party failed to win a seat, and former RN leader Marine Le Pen had to go through the second round for her seat due to low turnout.

In contests between NUPES and RN candidates, officials from Ensemble said they would decide on a "case-by-case basis" on whether or not to support a candidate. Élisabeth Borne, Prime Minister of France, said: "Our position is no vote for RN." At the same time, she expressed support only for NUPES candidates who in her view respect republican values. The first round confirmed that La France Insoumise (LFI) within NUPES and among the French Left, while the centre-left dissidents achieved a much lower numbers of votes like the 2022 French presidential election; of the over 70 dissident candidates, only 15 qualified for the second round.

The first round was marked by a record low turnout at 47.5%. Additionally, there was some controversy in the results between the Ministry of the Interior and French news outlets, such as France Info and Le Monde, in particular on whether NUPES or Ensemble finished first; This was due to disagreements on whether left-wing candidates should be considered within the NUPES framework or not; similar discrepancies also existed for UDC and other alliances. NUPES finished either second (per the Ministry of the Interior) or first (per Le Monde), slightly behind or ahead of Ensemble (25.75–25.66% per the Ministry of the Interior and 26.1–25.9% per Le Monde).

Second round 
The second round had a higher turnout than that in the 2017 French legislative election but did not match that of the first round in 2020. The Ensemble alliance slightly underperforming polls and lost their absolute majority in Parliament, while still winning the most seats. NUPES slightly underperformed from polling but still managed to substantially increase their proportion of seats and was to reported to have won 131 seats per the Ministry of the Interior. RN substantially overperformed polls to win an unprecedented 89 seats and become the largest parliamentary opposition group due to each component party of NUPES intending to form their own parliamentary group, eclipsing the UDC coalition, which received enough seats to be a kingmaker in the next government but lost seats as expected, and was projected to win 75 seats. It was the best performance for the far right in the era of the French Fifth Republic, and the best overall since the late 19th century. Several news outlets, such as Agence France-Presse, gave a different result as to the final seat count, with Ensemble on 247, NUPES on 142, and UDC on 64, respectively, per Le Monde. This was due to differences as to candidates, particularly in the French overseas constituencies, being classified as members of these alliances or not.

The elections resulted in a hung parliament, as Ensemble had only a relative majority (a plurality). It was the first hung parliament since the establishment of the five-year presidential term after the 2000 French constitutional referendum, as well as the first relative majority only since the 1988 French legislative election. The overall results were seen as a disavowal and major blow for Macron, with a risk of political instability and gridlock. Finance Minister Bruno Le Maire called the outcome a "democratic shock", and said that if the other blocs did not cooperate, "this would block our capacity to reform and protect the French". Prime Minister Borne commented: "The result is a risk for our country in view of the challenges we have to face." LR, the leading party of UDC, was thought to be the kingmaker and potentially play a role for Macron to keep his presidential majority; however, Christian Jacob, the president of LR and the leader of UDC, stated that his party would remain in opposition, meaning Macron's party would not remain in control of the legislature. Mélenchon called the results "disappointing" and said that NUPES and the French Left should form a united, single parliamentary group to avoid RN from becoming the largest opposition group in Parliament, which was refused by leaders of Europe Ecology – The Greens (EELV), French Communist Party (PCF), and Socialist Party (PS).

National results 

|- style="background-color:#E9E9E9;text-align:right"
|-
| colspan="13" | 
|-
! style="text-align:center" colspan="3" rowspan="2"| Parties and coalitions
! colspan="3"| First round
! colspan="3"| Second round
! colspan="2"| Total
|- style="background-color:#E9E9E9;text-align:center"
! width="75"|Votes
! width="30"|%
! width="30"|Seats
! width="75"|Votes
! width="30"|%
! width="30"|Seats
! width="30"|Seats
! +/-
|-
| style="background-color:"|
| style="text-align:left;"| Ensemble
| ENS
| 5,857,364
| 25.75
| 1
| 8,002,419
| 38.57
| 244
| 245
| style="text-align:centre;"| 
|-
| style="background-color:#BB1840"|
| style="text-align:left;"| 
| NUPES
| 5,836,079
| 25.66
| 4
| 6,556,198
| 31.60
| 127
| 131
| style="text-align:centre;"|  79
|-
|-
| style="background-color:"|
| style="text-align:left;"| National Rally
| RN
| 4,248,537
| 18.68
| 0
| 3,589,465
| 17.30
| 89
| 89
| style="text-align:centre;"|  81
|-
| style="background-color:#B9DAFF"|
| style="text-align:left;"| Union of the Right and Centre
| UDC
| 2,568,502
| 11.29
| 0
| 1,512,281
| 7.29
| 64
| 64
| style="text-align:centre;"|  66
|-
| style="background-color:"|
| style="text-align:left;"| Reconquête
| REC
| 964,775
| 4.24
| 0
| –
| –
| 0
| 0
| style="text-align:centre;"| New
|-
| style="background-color:"|
| style="text-align:left;"| Miscellaneous left
| DVG
| 713,574
| 3.14
| 0
| 408,706
| 1.97
| 21
| 21
| style="text-align:centre;"|  9
|-
| style="background-color:#77ff77"|
| style="text-align:left;"| Ecologists
| ECO
| 608,314
| 2.67
| 0
| –
| –
| 0
| 0
| style="text-align:centre;"|  1
|-
| style="background-color:"|
| style="text-align:left;"| Miscellaneous right
| DVD
| 530,782
| 2.33
| 0
| 231,071
| 1.11
| 10
| 10
| style="text-align:centre;"|  4
|-
| style="background-color:"|
| style="text-align:left;"| Regionalists
| REG
| 291,384
| 1.28
| 0
| 264,779
| 1.28
| 10
| 10
| style="text-align:centre;"|  5
|-
| style="background-color:"|
| style="text-align:left;"| Miscellaneous centre
| DVC
| 283,612
| 1.25
| 0
| 99,145
| 0.48
| 4
| 4
| style="text-align:centre;"|  4
|-
| style="background-color:#bb0000"|
| style="text-align:left;"| Miscellaneous far-left
| DXG
| 266,412
| 1.17
| 0
| 11,229
| 0.05
| 0
| 0
| style="text-align:centre;"|  0
|-
| style="background-color:"|
| style="text-align:left;"| Sovereignist right
| DSV
| 249,603
| 1.10
| 0
| 19,306
| 0.09
| 1
| 1
| style="text-align:centre;"|  0
|-
| style="background-color:"|
| style="text-align:left;"| Miscellaneous
| DIV
| 192,624
| 0.85
| 0
| 18,295
| 0.09
| 1
| 1
| style="text-align:centre;"|  2
|-
| style="background-color:;"|
| style="text-align:left;"| Radical Party of the Left
| PRG
| 126,689
| 0.56
| 0
| 34,576
| 0.17
| 1
| 1
| style="text-align:centre;"|  2
|-
| style="background-color:#404040"|
| style="text-align:left;"| Miscellaneous far-right
| DXD
| 6,457
| 0.03
| 0
| –
| –
| 0
| 0
| style="text-align:centre;"|  1
|-
| style="background-color:#E9E9E9" colspan="13"|
|- style="font-weight:bold"
| style="text-align:left" colspan="3"| Total
| 22,744,708
| 100.00
| 5
| 20,747,470
| 100.00
| 572
| 577
|
|-
| style="background-color:#E9E9E9" colspan="12"|
|-
| style="text-align:left" colspan="3"| Valid votes
| 22,744,708
| 97.80
| style="background-color:#E9E9E9" rowspan="6"|
| 20,747,470
| 92.36
| style="background-color:#E9E9E9" colspan="3" rowspan="6"|
|-
| style="text-align:left" colspan="3"| Blank ballots
| 362,193
| 1.56
| 1,235,844
| 5.50
|-
| style="text-align:left" colspan="3"| Null ballots
| 149,306
| 0.64
| 480,962
| 2.14
|-
| style="text-align:left" colspan="3"| Turnout
| 23,256,207
| 47.51
| 22,464,276
| 46.23
|-
| style="text-align:left" colspan="3"| Abstentions
| 25,697,541
| 52.49
| 26,125,084
| 53.77
|-
| style="text-align:left" colspan="3"| Registered voters
| 48,953,748
| style="background-color:#E9E9E9"|
| 48,589,360
| style="background-color:#E9E9E9"|
|-
| style="background-color:#E9E9E9" colspan="12"|
|-
| style="text-align:left" colspan="12"| Source: Ministry of the Interior
|}

Results by constituency 

2022 French legislative election map results by constituency

Electorate

Aftermath 

Due to the Ensemble's loss of 100+ seats, they were now 44 seats shy of a majority in the National Assembly, and need to find support among other MPs from the left or the right side of politics to help build a working majority government. President Macron asked Prime Minister Borne, who offered her resignation, to stay in office with the same cabinet in an effort to gain time according to analysts to form a stable government, with or without Borne. LFI requested a vote of no confidence to be held on 5 July.

Despite not ruling out any deal with any party, it is speculated that Macron and Ensemble are eyeing a deal with UDC. Despite previously stating otherwise, UDC's Jacob confirmed that he would take part in talks with Macron. RN's Le Pen and the leaders of two NUPES parties, Olivier Faure (PS) and Fabien Roussel (PCF), stated that they would take part in talks with Macron. LFI's Mélenchon confirmed that he would not take part in talks.

Parliamentary groups formation

Vote of no confidence 

Shortly after the election, a vote of no confidence was tabled by the left-wing NUPES coalition. It was rejected as only left-wing parliamentary groups supported the motion.

Prime Minister Borne offered her resignation on 21 June 2022, but President Macron refused to accept it. Talks among the various parties to form a stable majority government began later on 21 June but rapidly failed. On 6 July, Borne presented her minority government policy plan to the Parliament.

See also 
 Elections in France

Notes

References 

2022 elections in France
 
June 2022 events in France
France
June 2022 events in Europe
Legislative elections in France